Kampå is a village in the municipality of Nes, Akershus, Norway. Its population in 2005 was 544.

Villages in Akershus
Nes, Akershus